Adrift In Soho is a novel by Colin Wilson. It was first published in England in 1961 by Victor Gollancz. The novel describes the English beat generation. The novel was republished to great acclaim by New London Editions in 2011, when Cathi Unsworth wrote 'Adrift in Soho is currently in production by Burning Films and with such rich source material, perhaps Wilson will now receive some contemporary reassessment for his continuing fascination with the human condition and the wit, warmth and insight that he brings to his accounts of those he has shared his unusual journeys with.'

Plot
The story opens in the late summer of 1955. Nineteen-year-old Harry Preston, having been granted an early discharge from national service with the RAF, moves to London from a small English provincial town to find life and adventure. Fancying himself as a writer, he drifts towards the central district of Soho, and soon enough he is included in the destitute but creative environment of the new Beat Generation. Harry meets an out of work actor, James Street. Street introduces Harry to the bohemian way of life and the novel recounts their misadventures. Harry travels upwards through this new world of wannabe artists, poets and writers, that have set up camp in the bohemian and not so posh 50s Soho and Notting Hill, he begins to slowly understand his role in this world.

Film Adaptation 
Adrift in Soho - The Movie was written and directed by Pablo Behrens, and produced by Pablo Behrens and Owen Drake; starring Owen Drake, Caitlin Harris, Chris Wellington and Emily Seale-Jones. The film was released theatrically on 14 November 2018 at the Prince Charles Cinema in London and then had a re-run at the same cinema in November 2019. The film version varies from the original novel in that it introduces two Free Cinema documentary film makers that tell the story from the point of view of the camera lens. This point is enhanced by the use of Dziga Vertov’s ‘camera eye’ montage twice in the film. The use of the film makers is based on Colin Wilson’s experiences in London when he was for a time in contact with film makers belonging to the movement. Wilson had an appearance in one of their short documentaries called "Food For a Blush" in which he was featured in a sleeping bag in a London park.

The result is an unusual version of a film-within-a-film. In this case the movie is also within a novel because the co-protagonists in the book like Marty, The Artist, Ironfoot Jack, Raoul Montauban and others only exist when they are interviewed by the film makers.

External links 

 
 Adrift in Soho website

References 
 http://www.3ammagazine.com/3am/going-underground/
 http://www.londonfictions.com/colin-wilson-adrift-in-soho.html  Colin Stanley's article on 'Adrift in Soho' on the London Fictions website

1961 British novels
British novels adapted into films
Novels by Colin Wilson
Fiction set in 1955
Novels about actors
Novels about writers
Novels set in London
British bildungsromans
British philosophical novels
Victor Gollancz Ltd books